Tricolia punctura is a species of sea snail, a marine gastropod mollusk in the family Phasianellidae.

Description
The length of the shell attains 1 mm.

Distribution
This species occurs in the Mediterranean Sea off Italy and Corsica.

References

External links
 Gofas, S.; Le Renard, J.; Bouchet, P. (2001). Mollusca. in: Costello, M.J. et al. (eds), European Register of Marine Species: a check-list of the marine species in Europe and a bibliography of guides to their identification. Patrimoines Naturels. 50: 180-213

Phasianellidae
Gastropods described in 1993